was one of 23 escort destroyers of the Tachibana sub-class of the  built for the Imperial Japanese Navy during the final stages of World War II. Completed in mid-1945, the ship was slightly damaged during the American attacks on Kure and the Inland Sea in July. She was used to repatriate Japanese personnel after the war until 1947. Mid-year the destroyer was turned over to the United States and subsequently scrapped.

Design and description
The Tachibana sub-class was a simplified version of the preceding  to make them even more suited for mass production. The ships had two Kampon geared steam turbines, each driving one propeller shaft, using steam provided by two Kampon water-tube boilers.

The main armament of the Tachibana sub-class consisted of three Type 89  dual-purpose guns in one twin-gun mount aft and one single mount forward of the superstructure. The single mount was partially protected against spray by a gun shield. The accuracy of the Type 89 guns was severely reduced against aircraft because no high-angle gunnery director was fitted. They carried a total of 25 Type 96  anti-aircraft guns in 4 triple and 13 single mounts. The Tachibanas were equipped with Type 13 early-warning and Type 22 surface-search radars. The ships were also armed with a single rotating quadruple mount amidships for  torpedoes. They could deliver their 60 depth charges via two stern rails and two throwers.

Construction and service

Kaba (Birch) was ordered in Fiscal Year 1943 under the Modified 5th Naval Armaments Supplement Program as part of the Matsu class, but the design was simplified to facilitate production and the ship was one of those built to the modified design. She was laid down on 15 October 1944 by Fujinagata Shipyards in Osaka, launched on 27 February 1945 and completed on 29 May. The ship was assigned to the 11th Destroyer Squadron of the Combined Fleet to work up. On 15 July her crew was reinforced by that of her disabled sister  and Kaba was transferred to Destroyer Division 52 of Escort Squadron 31 of the Combined Fleet.

When American carrier aircraft of Task Force 38 attacked Kure Naval Arsenal on 24 July, the destroyer was only slightly damaged, although 16 men were killed and 52 wounded. During a follow-up attack on 11 August, she was again slightly damaged with 19 crewmen killed. The ship was turned over to Allied forces at Kure at the time of the surrender of Japan on 2 September and was stricken from the navy list on 5 October. Kaba was disarmed and used to repatriate Japanese personnel in 1945–1947. The ship was turned over to the United States on 4 August of the latter year and was scrapped by Mitsui Engineering & Shipbuilding at its Tamano facility.

Notes

Bibliography

 
 

Tachibana-class destroyers
Ships built by Fujinagata Shipyards
1945 ships
World War II destroyers of Japan